The Paraguay campaign (1810–11) of the Argentine War of Independence was the attempt by a Buenos Aires-sponsored militia, commanded by Manuel Belgrano, to win the royalist Intendency of Paraguay for the cause of May Revolution. In Paraguay it is considered as their War of Independence.

The first battles fought were the Battle of Campichuelo and Battle of Campo Maracana, in which the Argentinians claimed victory. However, they were completely vanquished in the subsequent Battle of Paraguarí and Battle of Tacuarí. The campaign ended in a military failure and Paraguay broke its links with the Spanish crown just two months after Belgrano's withdrawal, starting its course towards full independence.

Actions of "la Primera Junta"

Three months after the creation of the Primera Junta, Manuel Belgrano was appointed Chief Commander of an army destined to gather support at Corrientes, Santa Fe, Paraguay and the Banda Oriental territories. A few days later his goal was made more specific: he must aim for Paraguay. The junta had been informed that the patriotic party was strong there, and a small army would suffice to take control. Trusting such information, Belgrano moved towards Paraguay with two possible goals—to guarantee loyalty for the junta in Paraguay or promote a new government that would stay on friendly terms with Buenos Aires.

Belgrano headed north with nearly 200 men, expecting to gather more soldiers on his way to the Paraná River. Soldiers from the Blandengues regiments of San Nicolás and Santa Fe did join him en route, and later the junta sent reinforcements of another 200 soldiers. The army was welcomed by most of the population they encountered along the way, receiving donations and new recruits in most villages. Finally the small army grew to nearly 950 men, consisting of infantry and cavalry, divided into four divisions with one piece of artillery each.

The Paraguayan Congress of July 24th, 1810

Paraguay was a rather isolated region of the Viceroyalty of the Río de la Plata, which made the ideas of regional independence stronger than in other provinces of the Viceroyalty. The road to Paraguayan independence began at the Congress of July 24, 1810, which was called by the last colonial governor to express the province's loyalty to the Spanish crown. Paraguayans indeed refused to pledge themselves to the Primera Junta of Buenos Aires and agreed to remain loyal to the King of Spain—yet the process of independence started here, as many Paraguayans, led by José Gaspar Rodríguez de Francia and other patriots, took control of the situation and started working to obtain independence, both from the United Provinces of the Río de la Plata and the Kingdom of Spain.

Belgrano ignored all this when he invaded Paraguay, believing that he would find a favorable political situation. There were three main political tendencies in Paraguay: those who supported the Spanish Regency Council, those who supported the Junta of Buenos Aires and those who supported independence.

The campaign 

By the end of October Belgrano's army stopped at Curuzú Cuatiá, where an old border conflict between Corrientes and Yapeyu was solved. He set the territories that would belong to Curuzu Cuatiá and Mandisoví, and organized their urban layout around the chapel and the school. By November 1810 the army reached the Paraná River near Apipé island, and there Belgrano took measures to benefit the natives that were living in missions. With his authority as representative of the junta he gave them full civil and political rights, granted lands, authorized commerce with the United Provinces and lifted the inability to take public or religious office. However, the junta later requested that he seek authorization for such changes in the future.

From that point the army moved to Candelaria, which was used as a stronghold for the attack on Paraguay. The terrain gave a clear advantage to Velazco's Paraguayan troops, who confronted Belgrano: the Paraná River, nearly 1,000 m. wide, was an effective natural barrier; once it was crossed the Argentine army would have to move for a long distance across a land without supplies. Swamps, hills, rivers and lakes would also force the army to march slowly, making a possible retreat difficult. The Parana was crossed with several boats on December 19, and a force of 54 Paraguayan soldiers was forced to flee during the battle of Campichuelo.

Belgrano saw Velazco's army from the Mbaé hill, and despite being greatly outnumbered he ordered the attack anyway, trusting in the moral strength of his soldiers. When the battle of Paraguarí started, Belgrano's troops had an initial advantage, but eventually Velazco's numerical superiority prevailed, thanks to the intervention of the Paraguayan patriots, around 3,500 men, resulting in the combined Paraguayan forces vastly outnumbering the Argentines. Even with casualties of ten dead and 120 taken prisoner, Belgrano wanted to keep on fighting, but his officers convinced him to retreat. His intent to continue was actually based on sound military tactics: while the Paraguayan forces outnumbered his, he knew that they were barely armed, while his troops had full equipment and supplies.

The army left for Tacuarí, being closely watched by the combined armies of Fulgencio Yegros and Manuel Atanasio Cabañas. Those two armies consisted of nearly 3000 troops, while Belgrano was left with barely 400. They were attacked from many sides during the Battle of Tacuarí on March 9. Greatly outnumbered and losing an unequal fight, Belgrano was requested to surrender, but refused to do so. He reorganized his remaining 235 men and ordered his secretary to burn all his documents and personal papers to prevent them from falling into enemy hands. He arranged for the troops and artillery to fire constantly, forcing the Paraguayan troops to disperse. When the fire stopped he requested an armistice, telling Cabañas that he had arrived in Paraguay to aid and not to conquer, but considering the open hostility he had found, he would leave the province. Cabañas accepted, on the condition that they left Paraguay within a day.

Aftermath 
The Paraguay campaign was a complete defeat for the Primera Junta from a military point of view. For the Paraguayans, the defeat of Belgrano resulted in independence from the rule of Buenos Aires and was the launching pad for their liberty from the yoke of Spain. That's why both Paraguayans and Argentines consider that, despite the victory of Paraguay and the independence of the Intendencia del Paraguay from Buenos Aires, the actions of Belgrano were very important for the decisive Paraguayan independence from Spain. However, in doing so they also broke up with Buenos Aires: they maintained good relations, but were no longer part of the same political entity.

See also 

 Manuel Belgrano
 Argentine War of Independence
 History of Paraguay

Bibliography

References

Campaigns of the Argentine War of Independence
Wars involving Paraguay
Conflicts in 1811
Argentina–Paraguay relations